The Indian cricket team toured South Africa during the 1996–97 season, playing three Tests from 21 December 1996 to 30 January 1997. Prior to the series, India toured South Africa in the 1992–93 season, losing the Test series 0–1. India was led by Sachin Tendulkar while South Africa was led by Hansie Cronje. The series was Tendulkar's first overseas Test tour as captain and third overall. The tour began with a Test series (named Castle Lager Series for sponsorship reasons), consisting of three matches. South Africa won the first two matches by a huge margin, thereby winning the series 2–0, while the final Test ended in a draw. At the end of the series, Brian McMillan of South Africa emerged as the top run-scorer with 296 runs, with an average of 98.66. He was closely followed by fellow team member Daryl Cullinan with 291 runs and India's Rahul Dravid (277 runs). Allan Donald and Javagal Srinath finished the series as top wicket-takers capturing 20 and 18 wickets respectively. The former was named "man of the series".

The Test series was followed by a triangular One-Day tournament, which included Zimbabwe as the third team. South Africa won all its round-robin matches, and played against India in the finals; they defeated India by 17 runs to win the title. Donald once again ended up as the leading wicket-taker in the tournament with 18 wickets,  while Cronje was declared "man of the series".

Squads 

The South Africa squad announced for the first two Tests excluded regulars Jonty Rhodes, Fanie de Villiers and Pat Symcox. Rhodes was omitted owing to an injury and concerns over suitability of his form for Test cricket, Symcox over the use of two spinners on bouncy wickets; Paul Adams made the team, while de Villiers' exclusion went unexplained by the team management. Derek Crookes, Nicky Boje, John Commins, who were members of the team's tour of India earlier that season, were also excluded. Shaun Pollock, who missed his made the squad upon recovering from a heel injury. Jacques Kallis was also included alongside uncapped Transvaal player Adam Bacher. Their ODI squad was announced on 20 January 1997. Rhodes was recalled to the side following good performances for Natal in the domestic circuit. After good performances in the Test series, Kallis was recalled. After the squad was announced, Brian McMillan  ruled out with an inflamed tendon in his left foot; Craig Matthews was named as his replacement. Matthews injured his ankle during the second game and was replaced by Rudi Bryson.

A 16-member India squad was announced for the Test series. Sachin Tendulkar was retained as the captain; Sunil Dev was named manager for the tour. Navjot Singh Sidhu and Vinod Kambli were not considered for selection due to disciplinary reasons, while Ajay Jadeja, Sunil Joshi, Wasim Jaffer, Sanjay Manjrekar and Abey Kuruvilla were left out from the squad. Overall, four seam bowlers and two spinners made the squad. However, the inclusion of three wicket-keepers including uncapped player Pankaj Dharmani attracted criticism. Jadeja and Joshi were later brought in for the triangular ODI series, along with Robin Singh and Salil Ankola, who replaced Dharmani, David Johnson, Venkatapathy Raju and Woorkeri Raman of the Test side.

Tour matches

Three-day: Eastern Province v Indians

55-over: Natal Invitation XI v Indians

50-over: Griqualand West v Indians

Three-day: Free State v Indians

50-over: South Africa A v Indians

Test matches

1st Test

After India won the toss and elected to field first, South Africa were bowled out for 235 runs. India managed just 100 runs in their first innings. South Africa in their second innings made 259, setting a target of 395 for India. India ended up scoring 66 runs, their fourth lowest total in Tests, thereby losing the match by 328 runs.

2nd Test

3rd Test
South africa appealed for bad light and escaped defeat.

See also
1996–97 Standard Bank International One-Day Series

References

External links
 Tour home at ESPNcricinfo
 India in South Africa, Dec 1996-Jan 1997 at ESPNcricinfo archive
 

1996 in South African cricket
1997 in South African cricket
South African cricket seasons from 1970–71 to 1999–2000
1996-97
International cricket competitions from 1994–95 to 1997
1996 in Indian cricket
1997 in Indian cricket